The 9th Infantry Division was a formation of the Ottoman Turkish Army, during the Balkan Wars, and the First World War.

Gallipoli Campaign 
Two thirds of the 19th Division were Syrians under Colonel Mustafa Kemal (Kemal Atatürk). The struggle formed the basis for the Turkish War of Independence and the declaration of the Republic of Turkey eight years later. "Two thirds of the troops who made up his (colonel Mustafa Kemal) 19th Division that faced the first wave of the Allied invasion were Syrian Arabs, comprising the 72nd and 77th regiments of the Ottoman army", according to Bill Sellars, Australian writer and historian.

Formation
25th Infantry Regiment
26th Infantry Regiment
27th Infantry Regiment

References
Footnotes

Sources
 
 
 
 

Military units and formations of the Ottoman Empire in the Balkan Wars
Military units and formations of the Ottoman Empire in World War I
Infantry divisions of the Ottoman Empire